Phú Thiện is a rural district (huyện) of Gia Lai province in the Central Highlands region of Vietnam.

References

Districts of Gia Lai province